Azrieli may refer to:

Surname
David Azrieli, CM CQ (1922–2014), Canadian real estate tycoon, developer, designer, architect and philanthropist
Sharon Azrieli, soprano singer and cantor from Montreal, Quebec

Business
Azrieli Group, Israeli real estate and holding company

Buildings
Azrieli Center, a complex of skyscrapers in Tel Aviv, Israel
Azrieli Sarona Tower, skyscraper in the Sarona neighborhood, Tel Aviv, Israel

Education
Azrieli College of Engineering Jerusalem, an Israeli public academic college
Azrieli Graduate School of Jewish Education and Administration, graduate school part of Yeshiva University

See also
Asrael
Asriel
Azrael
Azri'el
Azriel (disambiguation)